Senga McCrone (1934-2020) was a Scottish international lawn and indoor bowler.

Bowls career
In 1971 as a member of the Lisnagarvey Club she won the 1971 Irish National Bowls Championships fours title. The success meant qualification for the British Isles Bowls Championships and subsequently she won the fours title in 1972.

She won a silver medal in the singles at the 1986 Commonwealth Games in Edinburgh, becoming the first Scottish woman to win a Commonwealth Games medal. Six years later she won a gold medal in the fours at the 1992 World Outdoor Bowls Championship in Worthing.

McCrone also competed in the singles competition at the 1990 Commonwealth Games but pulled out of the 1994 Commonwealth Games following a dispute over her position in the fours team.

In 1993 she won the fours gold medal at the inaugural Atlantic Bowls Championships.

Personal life
Senga grew up in Hurlford, East Ayrshire before moving to Northern Ireland in her thirties. It was during this time that she began bowling for the Lisnagarvey Bowling Club near Belfast. In later life she lived in Hawick with her husband Jimmy and they had two sons. She died on 29 November 2020 at the Borders General Hospital.

References

Scottish female bowls players
1934 births
2020 deaths
Bowls World Champions
Commonwealth Games medallists in lawn bowls
Commonwealth Games silver medallists for Scotland
Bowls players at the 1986 Commonwealth Games
Bowls players at the 1990 Commonwealth Games
Medallists at the 1986 Commonwealth Games